Nancy Rappaport is an American board certified child and adolescent psychiatrist. She serves as an associate professor of psychiatry at Harvard Medical School and is the attending child and adolescent psychiatrist at Cambridge Health Alliance a Harvard teaching affiliate, where she also serves as director of school-based programs. She has consulted for Cambridge Public Schools for nearly two decades, and oversees the Teen Health Center at Cambridge Rindge & Latin School.

Rappaport blogs often for the Huffington Post, and is the author of a memoir, "In Her Wake: A Child Psychiatrist Explores the Mystery of Her Mother's Suicide" (Basic Books, 2009) and "“The Behavior Code: A Practical Guide to Understanding and Teaching the Most Challenging Students," co-authored with behavior analyst Jessica Minahan.

Rappaport lives in Cambridge, Massachusetts.

Personal background
Rappaport was born in Boston, Massachusetts, to an influential family. Her father, Jerome, is a prominent Boston developer.

Her early life was shaped by the devastating suicide of her mother when Rappaport was only four years old. Rappaport’s mother, Nancy, overdosed on sleeping pills after a contentious divorce and losing a child custody battle in 1963.

Being the youngest of six siblings, Rappaport was kept in the dark about the facts of her mother's suicide when she was growing up. Rappaport has said that she has only one memory of her mother, standing in the hot sun with her, holding hands.

It was not until Rappaport birthed her first daughter that she began longing to understand her mother’s suicide and began investigating her life. She was given her mother’s journals and a 400-page roman à clef written by her mother that provided some insight. She began writing "In Her Wake" in the middle of the night while her daughter slept and published it in 2009. The memoir was awarded the Julia Ward Howe Book Award by the Boston Authors Club in 2010.

Rappaport has stated in interviews: “As a child psychiatrist I wanted to explore what may have happened to my mother as she was growing up that could have made her vulnerable to depression. I wanted to see if there were any clues about how my mother came to see suicide as the only viable option, and how she came to believe that she was expendable.”

She has three children with architect Colin Flavin.

Education and research
Rappaport earned a B.A. in English from Princeton University before graduating from Tufts University School of Medicine in 1988.

Between college and medical school, Rappaport taught science at The Children's Storefront School in Harlem, New York. Rappaport and the school were the subject of the Oscar-nominated documentary film, The Children’s Storefront.

Rappaport’s expertise focuses on the intersection of psychiatry and education. She writes often on the topics of psychopharmacology, behavioral issues in children and adolescents, school violence, and ways educators can cope with and respond to students with behavioral difficulties. In 2011, she received the American Academy of Child and Adolescent Psychiatry's 2011 Sidney Berman Award for School-Based Study and Intervention for Learning Disorders and Mental Health. Rappaport was also honored in 2013 with the Art of Healing Award, given by the Cambridge Health Alliance, which "celebrates visionary men and women who transcend boundaries, joyfully embrace humanity, and profoundly inspire the healing of body and spirit."

She frequently lectures at national hospitals and psychiatric conferences.

References

Year of birth missing (living people)
Living people
American people of Romanian-Jewish descent
American psychiatrists
People from Boston
Harvard University faculty
Princeton University alumni
Tufts University School of Medicine alumni
American women psychiatrists
HuffPost bloggers
21st-century American women